Bończa may refer to the following places:
Bończa, Greater Poland Voivodeship (west-central Poland)
Bończa, Lublin Voivodeship (east Poland)
Bończa, Masovian Voivodeship (east-central Poland)